Lullabies & Wildflowers is the second solo recording from singer and actress, Melissa Errico, and is a thematic collection of songs about mothers and their children. The album was released on Velour/Universal Records on 29 April 2008, (then Ghostlight Records). It was produced by Rob Mathes. The CD cover and accompanying booklet was created and illustrated by Kate Neckel.

Track listing

On 18 May 2015, Melissa Errico released a two track download only single, entitled "More Lullabies & Wildflowers" to raise money for the charity "The Bowery Babes". The songs are taken from the same recording sessions as the original album tracks:

References

2008 albums